Wild und Hund (lit. Wildlife and Dogs) is a German-language, biweekly special interest journal on the subject of hunting, which is published by the Paul Parey magazine publisher in Singhofen/ Taunus. Editor-in-chief is Heiko Hornung as of May 2016.

History and profile
Wild und Hund was founded by Paul Parey and has been published since 1894. It is the oldest and highest circulation hunting magazine in Germany. It covers hunting, equipment, game, territory, hunting policies and practices. Overall, the journal reaches about  readers. and is sold in 54 countries

References

External links
 

1894 establishments in Germany
Biweekly magazines published in Germany
German-language magazines
Sports magazines published in Germany
Hunting and fishing magazines
Magazines established in 1894